Air Marshal Boediardjo (16 November 1921 –  15 March 1997 ) was an Indonesian Minister of Information (1968 - 1973) for the Indonesian First Development Cabinet.

Education 
 Hollandisch-Inlandische School (HIS) Rejosari, Semarang, Indonesia (1935)
 Meer Uitgebreid Lager Onderwijs (MULO), Magelang, Indonesia (1939)
 Radio Technical Education, Bandung, Indonesia (1940)
 Education in Railways School, Semarang, Indonesia (1943-1944)
 Education in Aviation School, Bandung, Indonesia (1951)
 Squadron Commander's Course, Jakarta, Indonesia (1952)
 School of Life Sciences Strategy, Jakarta, Indonesia (1952)
 Royal Air Force Staff College, Andover, England (1954).

Career 
 Member of Militaire Luchtvaart (1939-1942)
 Member of Rikuyu Sokyoku (1943-1945)
 Deputy Minister Air Force Chief Staff (1945-1965)
 Director of Communication and Navigation in Indonesian Air Force (1952)
 Indonesian Air Force Attaché in Cairo, Egypt (1956-1961)
 Indonesian Ambassador for Cambodia (1965-1968)
 Indonesian Minister of Information (1968-1973)
 Indonesian Ambassador for Spain (1976-1979)
 Director of  Borobudur & Prambanan Temple Recreational Park (1979-1985)
 Chairman of Indonesian Press Association (1972)
 Chairman of the Indonesian Orchid Association [PAI] (1962-1983)
 Chairman of the Social and Culture [PEPABRI] (1974-1978)
 Chairman of the Wayang Puppet Foundation [Nawangi]  (1974 - )
 Head of Indonesian Economic, Social and Cultural Affairs -  Veterans Legion (1979 - )

Awards 
 Bintang Gerilya
 Bintang Garuda
 Bintang Dharma
 Bintang Mahaputera Adipradana (1973)
 Bintang Adikarya Pariwisata (1996)

References

1921 births
1997 deaths
Indonesian diplomats
Government ministers of Indonesia
Ambassadors of Indonesia to Spain
Ambassadors of Indonesia to Cambodia